Cryptocephalus gibbicollis is a species of case-bearing leaf beetle in the family Chrysomelidae. It is found in North America.

Subspecies
These three subspecies belong to the species Cryptocephalus gibbicollis:
 Cryptocephalus gibbicollis decrescens R. White, 1968
 Cryptocephalus gibbicollis decrestens White
 Cryptocephalus gibbicollis gibbicollis Haldeman, 1849

References

Further reading

External links

 

gibbicollis
Articles created by Qbugbot
Beetles described in 1849